New Page is a Japanese-language studio album by South Korean rock band F.T. Island, released on 8 May 2014 by Warner Music Japan. The band previously released three singles that were later included in the album, amongst them Mitaiken Future.

Track listing

References

F.T. Island albums
2014 albums
Japanese-language albums
Warner Music Japan albums